The 2020 season was the Pittsburgh Steelers' 88th in the National Football League, their 20th playing home games at Heinz Field, their 21st under general manager Kevin Colbert, and their 14th under head coach Mike Tomlin. The team vastly improved on their 8–8 record from 2019 beginning the season 11–0, a franchise-best. They became the first NFL team to do so since the Carolina Panthers in the 2015 season. However, that streak was broken after a Week 13 loss to the Washington Football Team. The Steelers clinched a playoff berth for the first time since 2017 after the Miami Dolphins' Week 14 loss to the Kansas City Chiefs and clinched their first AFC North title since 2017 with a Week 16 victory over the Indianapolis Colts.

The season marked the return of Ben Roethlisberger, who was sidelined for 14 games the season prior. However, despite entering Week 13 at 11–0, the Steelers lost four of their last five games to finish 12–4 and join the 1969 Los Angeles Rams as the only teams in NFL history to go 11–0 and lose 3 consecutive games afterwards. In the playoffs, the Steelers faced the Cleveland Browns in the Wild Card round, where they were defeated 48–37.

The Steelers swept the Ravens for the first time in three seasons. Their 11–0 start marked the longest the Steelers have gone before their first loss in a season in franchise history. They also went undefeated against the AFC South for the first time in six seasons. 

Because the Patriots went 7–9, their first losing season in 20 years, the Steelers ended the year as the only team from 2004 to this year that didn't have a single losing season.

Transactions
The Steelers have been involved in the following transactions during the 2020 season:

Trades

Free agent signings

Lost

Acquired

Cuts

Draft

Notes

 Pittsburgh traded 2020 first and fifth round selections and a 2021 sixth round selection to Miami in exchange for safety Minkah Fitzpatrick and a 2020 fourth round selection.
 Pittsburgh traded a third-round selection along with 2019 first- and second-round selections to Denver in exchange for Denver's 2019 first-round selection.
 Jacksonville traded a fifth-round selection to Pittsburgh in exchange for quarterback Joshua Dobbs.
 Pittsburgh traded a fifth-round selection to Seattle in exchange for tight end Nick Vannett.

Staff

Final roster

Preseason
The Steelers would have played the Dallas Cowboys in the Pro Football Hall of Fame Game on August 6, at Tom Benson Hall of Fame Stadium in Canton, Ohio, and the Steelers were to be represented by former head coach Bill Cowher and safeties Troy Polamalu and Donnie Shell. However, the game, the annual Hall of Fame enshrinement and the remainder of the preseason were later cancelled due to the COVID-19 pandemic, and the Hall of Fame game between the Steelers and Cowboys was rescheduled for 2021.

Regular season

Schedule
The Steelers' 2020 schedule was announced on May 7.

Note: Intra-division opponents are in bold text.

Game summaries

Week 1: at New York Giants

The Steelers started their season on the road against the Giants on Monday Night Football. In the first quarter, the Giants scored first when Graham Gano kicked a 21-yard field goal to make it 3–0. Later on in the quarter, Chris Boswell would tie the game at 3–3 with a 41-yard field goal. The Giants took the lead in the second quarter when Daniel Jones found Darius Slayton on a 41-yard TD pass to make it 10–3. The Steelers responded when Ben Roethlisberger found JuJu Smith-Schuster on a 10-yard TD pass (with a failed PAT) to make the score 10–9. Finally, the Steelers took the lead before halftime when Roethlisberger connected with James Washington on a 13-yard TD pass to make the score 16–10. After a scoreless third quarter, the Steelers got back to work when Boswell kicked a 36-yard field goal to make it 19–10. This was followed up by Roethlisberger connecting with Smith-Schuster again on an 8-yard TD pass to make it 26–10. Finally, the Giants wrapped up the scoring of the game when Jones and Slayton connected again for a 7-yard TD pass to make the final score 26–16.

With the win, the Steelers started their season 1–0.  They won their regular season-opening game for the first time since 2017.

In Roethlisberger's first game in 364 days, he went 21 of 32 for 229 yards and 3 touchdown passes, giving him a 117.8 passer rating.

The win was the third straight time that they have beaten the Giants.

Week 2: vs. Denver Broncos

After a road win on Monday Night Football, the Steelers headed home for a game against the Broncos. In the first quarter, the Steelers made it 7–0 after James Conner ran for a 2-yard TD for the only score of the period. In the second quarter, the Broncos managed to get on the board when Brandon McManus kicked a 49-yard field goal to make it 7–3. Ben Roethlisberger then found rookie WR Chase Claypool on an 84-yard TD pass to make it 14–3. Chris Boswell then put the Steelers up by a couple touchdowns at halftime with a 21-yard field goal to make it 17–3.

After the break, the Broncos eventually came within 3 when McManus kicked a 28-yard field goal to make it 17–6. Backup QB Jeff Driskel then found Noah Fant on a 20-yard TD pass (with a successful 2-point conversion) to make it 17–14. In the fourth quarter, the Steelers responded when Roethlisberger found Diontae Johnson on a 28-yard TD pass to make it 24–14. This would be followed on the next Broncos drive by Derek Watt tackling Broncos punter Sam Martin in the end zone for a safety to make it 26–14. Driskel then found Melvin Gordon III on a 16-yard TD pass to get the Broncos within 5, 26–21. The Broncos were able to drive late, getting to the Steelers' 15-yard line at the two-minute warning. However, the Steelers forced an incompletion on 3rd and 2, and then Terrell Edmunds sacked Driskel on 4th down, giving the ball back to the Steelers. On the second play of the next Steelers' drive, Conner carried for 59 yards, sealing the victory.

With the win, the Steelers improved to 2–0 for the first time since 2017. In addition, the quarterback/head coach duo of Roethlisberger and Tomlin won their 117th regular season game together, moving to third all-time.

Week 3: vs. Houston Texans

After a tough win at home, the Steelers stayed home for a game against the Texans. In the first quarter, the Steelers took an early 3–0 lead after Chris Boswell kicked a 33-yard field goal. However, the Texans took the lead later on in the quarter when DeShaun Watson found Randall Cobb on a 28-yard TD pass for a 7–3 lead. In the second quarter, the Texans made it 14–3 when David Johnson ran for a 2-yard TD. The Steelers fired back to take the lead with Ben Roethlisberger finding Eric Ebron a 10-yard TD pass, followed up by Roethlisberger finding JuJu Smith-Schuster on a 26-yard TD pass for a 17–14 lead. The Texans then scored on a Watson pass to Will Fuller to take back the lead at 21–17 before half. Chris Boswell scored the only points of the third quarter, kicking a field goal to bring the Steelers within one point with a score of 21–20. In the fourth quarter, James Conner ran for a touchdown and Smith-Schuster then caught a two-point conversion pass from Roethlisberger to put the Steelers ahead with what would be the final score of 28–21.

With the win, the Steelers go into their bye week 3–0.  It would be the team's first 3–0 start since 2010. For the 60th consecutive game, the Steelers recorded at least one sack on defense, reaching the second longest streak in NFL history. The game also snapped a streak of 25 games with at least one turnover committed by the Steelers. In addition, the Steelers scored 28 points for the first time since December 23, 2018. With his 221st game played for the Steelers, Roethlisberger set a new franchise record. With the Ravens' loss to the Chiefs on Monday Night Football, the Steelers took the lead in the AFC North.

With the win, the Steelers beat the Texans for the third straight time.

Week 5: vs. Philadelphia Eagles

After coming off their bye week, the Steelers stayed home for a game against the Eagles in the Battle of Pennsylvania. The Steelers were led by rookie Chase Claypool's 4 touchdowns. In the first quarter, the Steelers scored first when Chase Claypool ran for a 2-yard TD for a 7–0 lead. The Eagles tied it up when Miles Sanders ran for a 74-yard TD to make it 7–7. In the second quarter, the Steelers retook the lead when Ben Roethlisberger found Claypool on a 32-yard TD pass to make it 14–7. The Eagles tied the game back up when Sanders ran for a 1-yard TD for a 14–14 game. The Steelers then retook the lead before halftime when Chris Boswell kicked a 41-yard field goal to make it 17–14. The Steelers made it 24–14 and then 31–14 when Roethlisberger and Claypool hooked up again on a 5-yard touchdown pass, followed by James Conner's 1-yard TD run. The Eagles then drew closer after Carson Wentz found Greg Ward on an 8-yard TD pass (with a successful 2-point conversion) to make it 31–22. Then, they came closer in the fourth when Wentz found Travis Fulgham on a 4-yard TD pass to make it 31–29. Roethlisberger and Claypool closed out the scoring of the game when they hooked up for a 35-yard TD pass to make the final score 38–29.

With the win, the Steelers started their season 4–0 for the first time since 1979.

Week 6: vs. Cleveland Browns

After another tough victory, the Steelers stayed home for their first game against the Browns. The Steelers jumped out to a 24–0 lead before the Browns got on the board via Baker Mayfield's 13-yard TD pass to Rashard Higgins just before halftime. From the third quarter onwards, the Steelers scored the remaining 14 points to make the final score 38–7.

With the win, the Steelers improved to 5–0 for the first time since 1978.  The Steelers extended their home winning streak over the Browns to 17 games, dating back to 2004.

Week 7: at Tennessee Titans

After going 4–0 in their 4-game home stand, the Steelers then traveled for the first of a 3-game road trip against the Titans. They scored first in the first quarter when Ben Roethlisberger found Diontae Johnson on an 11-yard TD to make it 7–0. They made it 14–0 in the second quarter when Benny Snell ran for a 1-yard TD. The Titans then got on the board when Corey Davis caught a 4-yard TD pass from Ryan Tannehill to make it 14–7. The Steelers closed out the half with 10 straight points: Chris Boswell kicked a 38-yard field goal to make it 17–7 and then Johnson and Roethlisberger connected again on a 9-yard TD pass to make it 24–7. In the third quarter, the Steelers scored again to move up by 20 with Boswell's 30-yard field goal to make it 27–7. It would be all Titans the rest of the game. Tannehill found A.J. Brown on a 73-yard TD pass to make it 27–14. Stephen Gostkowski closed out the third quarter when he kicked a 51-yard field goal to make it 27–17. Derrick Henry then ran for a 1-yard TD in the fourth to make the score 27–24. Getting the ball back with seconds left, Gostkowski missed the game-tying field goal, sealing yet another win for the Steelers.

With the win, the Steelers improved to 6–0 for the second time in their franchise history; their first such start since 1978. They stand as the AFC's only undefeated team. With the Seahawks' loss to the Cardinals on Sunday Night Football, the Steelers stand as the NFL's only undefeated team through 7 weeks.

In the game, the Steelers scored an opening drive touchdown for the first time since Week 15 of the 2018 season.

This game was originally supposed to be played during Week 4, but was postponed due to the positive cases of COVID-19 within the Titans' organization.

This win marked the third straight time the Steelers have beaten the Titans.

Week 8: at Baltimore Ravens

After a tough road win, the Steelers then traveled again for their first game against the Ravens. The Steelers scored first in the first quarter when Robert Spillane returned an interception 33 yards for a touchdown to make it 7–0. The Ravens then scored 17 straight points to make it 17–7 in their favor at halftime, beginning when Lamar Jackson found Miles Boykin on a 6-yard pass to tie the game up, followed by Gus Edwards running for a 1-yard touchdown, and concluded by Justin Tucker's 51-yard field goal. In the third quarter, it was all Steelers, as they retook the lead when they made it 21–17 with Ben Roethlisberger's 18-yard touchdown pass to TE Eric Ebron followed up by James Conner's 1-yard touchdown run. In the fourth quarter, the Ravens would retake the lead when Jackson found Marquise Brown on a 3-yard touchdown to make it 24–21. Roethlisberger got the Steelers the lead back when he connected with Chase Claypool on an 8-yard touchdown pass, making the score 28–24. After stopping the Steelers and forcing them to punt with under one minute left, the Ravens were able to drive down the field. Jackson attempted a pass to the end zone on the final play to win the game, but it fell incomplete, sealing yet another win for the Steelers.

With the win, the Steelers improved to 7–0, their second 7–0 start in franchise history and first such start since 1978. They also defeated the Ravens for the first time since Week 9 of the 2018 season, defeating Lamar Jackson as a starter for the first time.

By shutting out Baltimore in the third quarter, the Steelers stopped an NFL-record 26 consecutive quarters of scoring by the Ravens. The game marked the first time in his career that Lamar Jackson lost a game after leading at halftime, and also marked the most giveaways by Jackson in a game with four.

Week 9: at Dallas Cowboys

After another close win, the Steelers traveled again to Arlington, Texas to take on the Cowboys. From the first into the second quarter, the Cowboys jumped to a 13–0 lead before the Steelers managed to score twice within the final two minutes of the half to make it a 13–9 game at halftime. In the third quarter, the Cowboys moved up by 10 with Greg Zuerlein's 45 and 39-yard field goals, making it 19–9. However, in the fourth quarter, it was all Steelers, who managed to come back with three straight scores: a Ben Roethlisberger to JuJu Smith-Schuster 31-yard TD pass (with a failed PAT); a Chris Boswell 43-yard field goal; and then finally a Roethlisberger to Eric Ebron 8-yard TD pass (with a failed 2-point conversion) to take a 24–19 lead. After forcing a turnover on downs, the Cowboys got the ball back to drive into Steelers territory with under a minute left in the game. However, Garrett Gilbert's pass fell incomplete in the end zone, sealing yet another Steelers win.

With the win, the Steelers improved to 8–0, the team's first 8–0 start in franchise history. 
The 8-game winning streak is the Steelers' longest regular season win streak since Weeks 6–14 of the 2017 season.

Week 10: vs. Cincinnati Bengals

After another tough road win, the Steelers headed home for Round 1 against the Bengals. In the first quarter, the Steelers jumped out to a 12–0 lead after 2 field goals from Chris Boswell, from 41 and 30 yards out, followed by Ben Roethlisberger connecting with Diontae Johnson on a 12-yard TD pass (with a failed 2-point conversion). The Bengals responded, coming within 5 when Joe Burrow found Tee Higgins on a 2-yard TD pass to make it 12–7. However, the Steelers would pull away by double digits before halftime when Roethlisberger found JuJu Smith-Schuster on an 8-yard TD pass to make it 19–7. Finally, Boswell kicked a 45-yard field goal to make it 22–7 at halftime. The Steelers scored the only points of the third quarter when Roethlisberger connected with Chase Claypool for an 11-yard TD pass to make it 29–7. In the fourth quarter, Roethlisberger and Claypool connected again for a 5-yard TD pass, putting the team up 36–7. The Bengals wrapped up the scoring of the game with Randy Bullock's 37-yard field goal to make the final score 36–10.

With the win, the Steelers improved to 9–0 for the first time in their history. The team also won their 11th straight game over the Bengals and won 9 games in a row for the first time since 2004.

Week 11: at Jacksonville Jaguars

After a huge win at home, the Steelers traveled south to take on the Jaguars. In the first quarter, the Jags would score a 41-yard field goal kicked by Chris McLaughlin to take a 3–0 lead for the quarter's only score. However, the Steelers would score all of the game's remaining points and win 27–3 for their biggest road victory of the season.

With the win, the Steelers improved to 10–0 for the first time ever in franchise history, and became the 18th team in NFL history to open 10–0 in the Super Bowl era. The Steelers also won 10 straight games for the first time since 2004.

Week 12: vs. Baltimore Ravens

After a road win, the Steelers returned home for their second game against the Ravens. In the first quarter, the Steelers made it 6-0 when Joe Haden returned an interception 14 yards for a touchdown (with a failed PAT). The Ravens took the lead later on with Gus Edwards's 1-yard touchdown run to make it 7–6. In the second quarter, the Steelers took the lead with Chris Boswell field goals from 25 and 27 yards out to make it 12–7. After a scoreless third quarter, the Steelers increased their lead in the fourth quarter when Ben Roethlisberger found JuJu Smith-Schuster on a 1-yard touchdown pass, making it 19–7. Later on in the quarter, the Ravens would wrap the scoring of the game up when third-string QB Trace McSorley found Marquise Brown on a 70-yard touchdown pass to make the final score 19–14.

With the win, the Steelers improved to 11–0. The team swept the Ravens for the first time since 2017 and for the first time in the Lamar Jackson era. They also won 11 in a row for the first time since 2004.

Week 13: vs. Washington Football Team

After a tough home win, the Steelers stayed home for a game against the Washington Football Team. After a scoreless first quarter, the Steelers jumped out to a 14–0 lead. Dustin Hopkins kicked a 49-yard field goal, making it 14–3 at halftime. Then in the third quarter, Peyton Barber ran for a 1-yard touchdown, making it 14–10. In the fourth quarter, the Steelers moved up by a touchdown after Matthew Wright kicked a 37-yard field goal, making it 17–10. However, Washington came back with 3 straight scores to win it 23–17, upsetting the Steelers.

With their 11-game winning streak snapped, the Steelers fell to 11–1. They also lost at home on Monday for the first time since 1991, which was also the last year that the Steelers lost to the Washington Football Team (then the Washington Redskins), who went on to win Super Bowl XXVI. With the New York Jets standing at 0–12, the Steelers' loss also ended the possibility of the 2020 season becoming the first to feature both an undefeated and winless team in one season.

With Robert Spillane's sack of Alex Smith in the first quarter, the Steelers tied the Tampa Bay Buccaneers' league record set in 2003 for the longest streak of games with at least one team sack, at 69 games.

Week 14: at Buffalo Bills

The game was a defensive struggle for most of the first half. Both teams combined for eight three-and-outs for the first twenty minutes of the game before a Dawson Knox fumble gave Pittsburgh the ball inside Buffalo territory, enabling Roethlisberger to find James Washington in the endzone. After an exchange of punts, Buffalo responded with their first red zone drive of the night producing a Tyler Bass 34-yard field goal, and a Taron Johnson 51-yard pick six shortly after Pittsburgh got the ball back, for a halftime score of 9–7 in favor of the hosts. Both teams improved offensively in the second half as the snow let up, but a fourth-quarter interception by the Buffalo defense was enough to seal a 26–15 Steelers loss, only their second of the season and their first loss by more than one score with Roethlisberger under center since Week 1 of 2019. This was their first loss at Buffalo since 1999.

With the loss, the Steelers fell to 11–2 and fell from first to second place in the overall AFC standings, even with their best win–loss record through thirteen games since 2017.

With Tyson Alualu's sack of Josh Allen in the second quarter, the Steelers passed the Tampa Bay Buccaneers for the league record for the longest streak of games with at least one team sack.

Week 15: at Cincinnati Bengals

After another loss, the Steelers traveled to Cincinnati for Round 2 against the Bengals. The Bengals would jump out to a 17–0 halftime lead, with all of their points coming off turnovers, before the Steelers came within 7 after a touchdown pass from Ben Roethlisberger to Diontae Johnson from 23 yards out, followed by Chris Boswell kicking a 25-yard field goal, making it 17–10. The Bengals pulled away in the fourth quarter when Ryan Finley ran for a 23-yard touchdown, making it 24–10. Benny Snell ran for a 1-yard touchdown to make it 24–17, but Austin Seibert kicked a 33-yard field goal to make the final score 27–17 in favor of the Bengals.

With their third straight loss, the Steelers fell to 11–3, and their lead in the AFC North shrunk to one game ahead of the Browns. They also had their 11-game winning streak against the Bengals snapped, having lost to them for the first time since Week 8 of 2015, which was at home. The Steelers were defeated by the Bengals in Cincinnati for the first time since Week 2 of 2013.

Week 16: vs. Indianapolis Colts

After another tough loss, the Steelers went back home to take on the Colts in their final home game of the season. The Colts scored the only points of the first quarter when Jonathan Taylor ran for a 6-yard TD to make it 7–0. The Steelers would tie it up in the second quarter when James Conner ran for a 1-yard TD. The Colts would go up 21–7 at halftime after Taylor ran for another TD, followed up by Philip Rivers finding Zach Pascal on a 42-yard pass. In the third quarter, the Colts moved up by 17 after Rodrigo Blankenship kicked a 28-yard field goal for a 24–7 lead. Starting in the third quarter and info the fourth, the Steelers went on a 21–0 run, with Ben Roethlisberger finding 3 different receivers for TD passes: a 39-yard pass to Diontae Johnson late in the third; a 5-yard pass to Eric Ebron in the fourth; and then finally a 25-yard pass to JuJu Smith-Schuster to take a 28–24 lead. Getting the ball back with a little over two minutes in the game, the Colts were able to drive into Steelers' territory after a pass interference penalty on the defense. However, the Colts would eventually wind up with a turnover on downs, giving the ball and the game to the Steelers, snapping the team's losing streak.

With their 3-game losing streak snapped, the Steelers improved to 12–3 and won the AFC North division title.

The Steelers defeated the Colts for the 7th consecutive time and improved to 25–6 all-time against the Colts, with a 16–2 record in Pittsburgh (both including playoffs).

Week 17: at Cleveland Browns

After a tough win at home, the Steelers traveled to Cleveland for their regular season finale and Round 2 against the Browns. Having already clinched the AFC North, the Steelers rested many of their starters. In the first quarter, the Browns made it 7–0 after Nick Chubb ran for a 47-yard TD.  They then made it 10–0 in the second quarter after Cody Parkey's 23-yard field goal. The Steelers then scored 3 times in a row; Matthew Wright kicked two field goals from 29 and 46 yards out to make it 10–6 at halftime and hit a 46-yarder to make it 10–9 in the third quarter. But the Browns quickly went back ahead by double digits with two touchdowns: Baker Mayfield found Austin Hooper on a 2-yard pass later on in the third, while in the fourth, Jarvis Landry ran for a 3-yarder, making the score 24–9.  The Steelers then scored two straight touchdowns of their own: Mason Rudolph found Chase Claypool on a 28-yard pass, followed by JuJu Smith-Schuster catching a 2-yard pass to make it 24–22. After the second touchdown, the Steelers attempted to tie the game by going for a 2-point conversion, but they failed as Mason Rudolph's pass was incomplete. The Steelers defense was unable to stop the Browns with just under two minutes left and the Browns were able to kneel out the clock for the win.

With the loss, the Steelers finished 12–4 and ended up with the #3 seed in the AFC.

Standings

Division

Conference

Postseason

Schedule

Game summaries

AFC Wild Card Playoffs: vs. (6) Cleveland Browns

After falling behind 28–0 in the first quarter, the Steelers were knocked out the Wild Card round and lost to the Browns in Pittsburgh for the first time since 2003.

Quarterback Ben Roethlisberger completed an NFL record 47 passes, which passed Drew Bledsoe and Jared Goff's joint record of 45 passes, for 501 yards and 4 touchdowns, but also threw 4 costly interceptions and lost a fumble.

Notes

Awards
The following Steelers were awarded for their performances:

AFC Offensive Player of the Week/Month

AFC Defensive Player of the Week/Month

References

External links 
 2020 Pittsburgh Steelers season statistics at Pro Football Reference 
 2020 Pittsburgh Steelers season statistics at jt-sw.com
 

Pittsburgh
Pittsburgh Steelers seasons
Pittsburgh Steelers
AFC North championship seasons
2020s in Pittsburgh